Cornel Nistorescu (born December 15, 1948) is a Romanian journalist, known for his editorial "Ode to America" regarding the American response to the terrorist attacks of September 11, 2001.

Nistorescu graduated from the University of Cluj in 1974 with a degree in Philology, Romanian and Italian Languages and Literatures. Nistorescu speaks Romanian, English, French, and Italian.

Nistorescu is a former editor and founder of several publications, and was the General Manager of the "Evenimentul" zilei daily and head of the "Expres" ltd. co. He has written three books and is a contributor to cultural publications or newspapers and weeklies in Belgium, the Netherlands, France, and the United States.

Honours
  Romanian Royal Family: 67th Knight of the Royal Decoration of the Cross of the Romanian Royal House

References 

Romanian newspaper editors
Babeș-Bolyai University alumni
Romanian newspaper founders
1948 births
Living people